Peter Vougt (born 12 January 1974) is a retired Swedish football defender.

References

1974 births
Living people
Swedish footballers
IK Brage players
Halmstads BK players
1. FC Lokomotive Leipzig players
BK Häcken players
Falkenbergs FF players
Association football defenders
Allsvenskan players
Swedish expatriate footballers
Expatriate footballers in Germany
Swedish expatriate sportspeople in Germany